Tullahassee is a town in Wagoner County, Oklahoma, United States. The population was 106 in both the 2010 and the 2000 censuses. It was the location of Tullahassee Mission, an Indian boarding school that burned in 1880. Because their population in the community had declined, the Muscogee Creek gave the school to Creek Freedmen, paying to replace the main building, and relocated with their families to the area of Wealaka Mission.

Tullahassee is considered the oldest of the surviving all-black towns in former Indian Territory. By 1880 Creek Freedmen and their descendants dominated the community population.

History
The town began in 1850, when the Creek Nation approved the Tullahassee Mission School at this site on the Texas Road. It was founded by Robert McGill Loughridge, a Presbyterian minister who had been serving in the Creek Nation since 1843 and had founded another mission that year.

In the years before the Emancipation Proclamation, many Creek citizens of the town had Black slaves. In the early 1880s, the population of freedmen had increased in the area, while the number of Muscogee Creek had declined. The freedmen were formerly enslaved African Americans and their descendants who were emancipated and granted citizenship in the Creek Nation after the American Civil War. Some also had Creek ancestry.

After a destructive fire at the school, the Creek Council decided to relocate most of their people, and transferred the Creek children to Wealaka Mission. They gave the school and community of Tullahassee to the freedmen in 1881. The Creek paid to have the school's main building replaced.

The residents opened a post office in 1899, and the town was incorporated in 1902. The Tullahassee Town Site Company was established to aid developing the town, and it both platted the town in 1907 and recruited black residents from throughout the post-Reconstruction South, where Jim Crow oppression was increasing. A. J. Mason served as president and L. C. Hardridge as secretary. This is now the oldest of the 13 surviving all-Black towns in the state, which were established during the period of Indian Territory. At one time there were 50 all-black towns.

The A. J. Mason Building is listed in the National Register of Historic Places (NR 85001743). Carter G. Woodson School, named for a prominent black historian, is listed in the Oklahoma Landmarks Inventory, and noted for its link to African-American history.

In 1914, the African Methodist Episcopal Church (AME) opened Flipper-Key-Davis College, also called Flipper-Davis, in the former Tullahassee Mission building. It was a period when private, municipal and state junior colleges were being founded. Flipper-Davis College was then the only private, higher-level education institution for African Americans in Oklahoma. This junior college closed in 1935 during the Great Depression.

In June 2021, Tullahassee Mayor Keisha Cullin was one of 11 mayors to form MORE (Mayors Organized for Reparations and Equity), a coalition of mayors who promised to create reparation pilot programs in their municipalities. Other members of MORE included the mayors of such large cities as Los Angeles, Denver, Sacramento, and Kansas City, Missouri.

Geography
Tullahassee is located at  (35.837758, -95.439295).

Demographics

As of the census of 2000, there were 106 people, 39 households, and 24 families residing in the town. There were 49 housing units at an average density of 92.6 per square mile (35.7/km2). The racial makeup of the town was 66.98% African American, 28.30% White, 0.94% Native American, and 3.77% from two or more races.

There were 39 households, out of which 17.9% had children under the age of 18 living with them, 38.5% were married couples living together, 20.5% had a female householder with no husband present, and 35.9% were non-families. 30.8% of all households were made up of individuals, and 15.4% had someone living alone who was 65 years of age or older. The average household size was 2.72 and the average family size was 3.40.

In the town, the population was spread out, with 25.5% under the age of 18, 9.4% from 18 to 24, 22.6% from 25 to 44, 27.4% from 45 to 64, and 15.1% who were 65 years of age or older. The median age was 38 years. For every 100 females, there were 116.3 males. For every 100 females age 18 and over, there were 92.7 males.

The median income for a household in the town was $14,750, and the median income for a family was $13,750. Males had a median income of $21,875 versus $12,500 for females. The per capita income for the town was $8,537. There were 42.3% of families and 58.9% of the population living below the poverty line, including 94.0% of under eighteens and 22.2% of those over 64.

2022 American Community Survey 
According to the most recent American Community Survey, the racial makeup of the town was 27.40% African American, 22.6% White, 6.16% Native American, and 43.84% from two or more races.

Education
Students are zoned to Porter Consolidated Schools.

See also
 Boley, Brooksville, Clearview, Grayson, Langston, Lima, Redbird, Rentiesville, Summit, Taft, Tatums, and Vernon, other "All-Black" settlements that resulted from the Land Run of 1889 in Indian Territory.

References

Towns in Wagoner County, Oklahoma
Towns in Oklahoma
Populated places in Oklahoma established by African Americans
Pre-statehood history of Oklahoma
Populated places established in 1850
1850 establishments in Indian Territory